Christopher Stuart Dangerfield (born 6 May 1972) is an English stand-up comedian, storyteller, writer, and critic known for his controversial subject matter and lifestyle. Having spent decades living in Soho, London he left in 2018 to live in Cambodia.

He has appeared at venues all over the UK and in Europe and is known for regularly attending the Edinburgh Fringe Festival, where he once received a nomination for the Malcolm Hardee Award for having his show 'Sex Tourist' sponsored by a brothel. Dangerfield's flyer entitled you to 10% off the services therein.

Early life
Dangerfield was born in Dartford, Kent, attending The Downs School. He studied contemporary art and music at Dartington Art college before going on to post-graduate study at Leeds University where he read Marxism, psychoanalysis and French post-structural thought, achieving a master's degree. After years describing himself as a Marxist he rejected the idea in 2016 in YouTube on his channel named 'Dangerfield'

Career

Stand-up comedy
It was the show Sex Tourist that established Dangerfield as a radical and original comedy voice. Dangerfield performed a one-off special of Sex Tourist at The Comedy Cafe, Shoreditch, selling out in 2 days, beating the 20-year record of the venue.
His 2014 show ‘Sex With Children’ cemented Dangerfield firmly in the UK Comedy scene, tackling difficult subject matter with panache, style and humour, producing an ‘astonishing piece of work’  During this show, Dangerfield was sent a Courgette by a feminist organisation, Feminist Avengers, who also targeted Jimmy Carr and Jim Jefferies, with the instruction to 'Go fuck himself'.

Dangerfield once toured with fellow comic Trevor Lock, performing for many types of people in their own front rooms. He has appeared with Rupert Everett on Channel 4 Show 'Love for Sale' discussing how he once spent £150,000 on Chinese Prostitutes and BBC3's ‘Prostitution: What’s The Harm’ Where he defended the right of Prostitutes and punters alike. He has appeared frequently on ITV, ITN, BBC Radio 4, Comedy Central, NBC, and other global networks.

Cultural Criticism and YouTube
After quitting stand-up after ten years performing, and two sell-out Edinburgh shows, the last being the controversial but critically acclaimed 'Sex With Children', based on his 'unflinching account of the childhood sexual abuse he suffered', Dangerfield began his solo podcast 'Dangerfield's Sunday Prescription'  an improvised weekly surreal meander. After thirty-two hours of improvised audio only material, Dangerfield started a YouTube channel, where he continues to deliver his edgy, unapologetic comedy and cultural criticism. Dangerfield streams almost daily on his YouTube channel, improvising hours of talk with his subscribers about culture, art, politics, literature, drugs and current affairs. He also interviews guests from various fields such as Jet Bomber Pilot Tim Davies and Professor Jeffrey Schaler, who wrote the book 'Addiction is a Choice' and discussed the weaponization of mental health with Dangerfield.

Writing
Dangerfield published his first novel 25 years ago, 'Tired, etc' which followed the lives of two permanently stoned wasters attempting to better their lot. On his YouTube channel and other platforms he's been promising the release of a new novel, an autobiographic tale of his time quitting Heroin in Thailand. Author Will Self introduced Dangerfield to writer Nick Papadimitriou who is currently working as editor on the novel. Will Self also recently described Dangerfield as a 'Gnostic Demiurge'. After setting up a SUBSTACK in 2021, called 'Dangerfield's Exaggeration's' a collection of largely autobiographical tales, Dangerfield released the first teaser of this forthcoming novel in a piece called 'Skagless and Bible Black' although he's yet to say when the finished novel will actually be published.

External links
Official website
SUBSTACK: 'Dangerfield's Exaggerations'
YouTube Channel: 'Dangerfield'

References

1972 births
English male comedians
English stand-up comedians
Living people
People from Dartford